Société de transport de Sherbrooke (STS) provides public transit services to Sherbrooke, the only major city in the Eastern Townships (Estrie) region of Quebec, Canada. After the amalgamation of what are now neighbouring boroughs into a regional municipality in 2002, service was expanded to cover the entire city with 53 routes and a fleet of more than 80 buses. STS is owned and operated by the city.

Bus services

Regular routes

Minibus routes

Taxibus routes

Specials routes
Specials Routes are in service 7 days a week, in the early morning or late evening, as a way to serve all the lines with fewer buses. Specials routes' frequency may vary from once a day to once per hour.

Transfer Points
Four points in the city are used for transfers between buses. At the corner of King and Sauvé streets in the Rock Forest sector, routes 17 and 18 are waiting for each other, every time.

Cégep: 1, 2, 3, 4, 5, 7, 9, 12, 14, 17, 19, 20, 55
Université de Sherbrooke: 6, 8, 9, 11, 14, 15, 16, 18, 24, 27, 29, 53
Station du Dépôt: 1, 2, 3, 7, 8, 12, 14, 19, 29, 55, 57
Carrefour de l'Estrie: 1, 3, 4, 11, 12, 17, 26, 50, 53, 55, 57

History
Chronology:
1897: Sherbrooke Street Railway Company
1910: Sherbrooke Railway and Power Company
1914: Sherbrooke City Transit Company Limited - began first bus service in 1928.
1952: Voyageur and Service Laramée Inc.
1962: Sherbrooke Transit Inc. - acquired by CMTS
1978: Corporation municipale de transport de Sherbrooke
1985: Corporation métropolitaine de transport de Sherbrooke (CMTS) - extended service to neighbouring towns 
2002: Société de transport de Sherbrooke - changed name with the amalgamation into a regional municipality.

References

External links

  
 STS Route Map

Sherbrooke
Transport in Sherbrooke